In logic, a rule of replacement is a transformation rule that may be applied to only a particular segment of an expression. A logical system may be constructed so that it uses either axioms, rules of inference, or both as transformation rules for logical expressions in the system. Whereas a rule of inference is always applied to a whole logical expression, a rule of replacement may be applied to only a particular segment. Within the context of a logical proof, logically equivalent  expressions may replace each other. Rules of replacement are used in propositional logic to manipulate propositions.

Common rules of replacement include de Morgan's laws, commutation, association, distribution, double negation, transposition, material implication, logical equivalence, exportation, and tautology.

See also 
 Salva veritate

Notes

References

Propositional calculus
Rules of inference
Logical expressions